Fashion Designer s/o Ladies Tailor is a 2017 Indian Telugu-language romantic comedy film directed by Vamsy and starring Sumanth Ashwin, Anisha Ambrose, Manali Rathod, and Manasa Himavarsh. The film is a sequel to the director's own Ladies Tailor (1986).

Plot

Cast 
Sumanth Ashwin as  Gopalam
Anisha Ambrose as Mahalakshmi
Manali Rathod as Ammulu
Manasa Himavarsha as Gedela Rani
Krishna Bhagavan
Krishnudu
Adduri Ravi Varma
Lakadi

Release 
The Hindu wrote that "Neither funny nor interesting, it is just a story stuck in a time warp".  The Times of India gave the film a three out of five stars and wrote, "A loose-fitting film that lacks an engaging narration." 123 Telugu gave the film a rating of two-and-three-quarter out of five and wrote, "On the whole, Fashion Designer is a film which has the glimpse of trademark Vamsy in only a strict few scenes". Sify said, "Though the comedy and narration is in old style, this movie is better among Vamsy's recent movies."

References

External links 

Indian romantic comedy films
Indian sequel films
Films directed by Vamsy
Films scored by Mani Sharma